The Black Cabinet, or Federal Council of Negro Affairs or Black Brain Trust, was the informal term for a group of African Americans who served as public policy advisors to President Franklin D. Roosevelt and First Lady Eleanor Roosevelt in his terms in office from 1933 to 1945. Despite its name, it was not an official organization. The term was coined in 1936 by Mary McLeod Bethune and was occasionally used in the press. By mid-1935, there were 45 African Americans working in federal executive departments and New Deal agencies.

History
Although the council was concerned with civil rights, Franklin D. Roosevelt believed there were larger problems to be addressed than racial inequality during the wartime years; he was also struggling to maintain the support of the Southern white Congressional Democrats. Roosevelt declined to support legislation making lynching a federal offense, as well as legislation banning the use of the poll tax in the South.

The Black Cabinet, with Eleanor Roosevelt's support, worked to ensure that African Americans received 10 percent of welfare funds. The Council argued that black citizens were underrepresented among recipients of aid under the New Deal, in large part because Southern Democrats had influenced the structure and implementation of programs to aid their white constituents. For instance, the Agricultural Adjustment Administration helped farmers but did not help farmworkers; farm owners were given the incentive to cut farm production, reducing the need for labor. Programs such as the Works Projects Administration (WPA), and the National Youth Administration (NYA) attempted to direct 10 percent of funds to African Americans (as their proportion of the US population). These agencies set up separate all-black units with the same pay and conditions as those in white units, to which black voters responded favorably.

Mary McLeod Bethune served as an informal organizer of the council, as well as the Director of Negro Affairs in the National Youth Administration. Rayford Wittingham Logan drafted Roosevelt's executive order prohibiting the exclusion of African Americans from the military in World War II. Other leaders included William H. Hastie and Robert C. Weaver. The leaders associated with the Black Cabinet are often credited with laying part of the foundation of the Civil Rights Movement that developed in strength in the postwar years.

The Council tried to create jobs and other opportunities for unemployed African Americans; concentrated in rural areas of the South, African Americans made up about twenty percent of the poor in the Depression Era. They were often the first to be let go from industrial jobs. Most African Americans did not benefit from some of the New Deal Acts.

The WPA created agencies that employed creative people in a variety of jobs, such as writers, artists, and photographers. WPA murals were painted and WPA sculptures were commissioned for numerous federal buildings that were constructed during this period. Photographers documented families across the South and in northern cities. The Federal Writers' Project paid its workers $20 a week, and they wrote histories of every state in the Union, covering major cities in addition.

Under Roscoe E. Lewis, the Virginia Writers' Project sent out an all-black unit of writers to interview formerly enslaved African Americans. Such accounts were also solicited in interviews in other states. The Slave Narrative Collection of the Federal Writers' Project stands as one of the most enduring and noteworthy achievements of the WPA.

Members of the group worked officially and unofficially in their agencies to provide insight into the needs of African Americans. In the past, there had never been so many African Americans chosen at one time to work in the federal government together for the express benefit of African Americans. The 45 primarily comprised an advisory group to the administration. Eleanor Roosevelt was said to encourage the formation of the Black Cabinet to help shape New Deal programs.

Members
Most members were not politicians but rather community leaders, scholars, and activists. Prominent members included Dr. Robert C. Weaver, a young economist from Harvard University and a race relations adviser. He worked with the White House to provide more opportunities for African Americans. In 1966 he became the first African American cabinet member, appointed by Lyndon B. Johnson as Secretary of the newly created Department of Housing and Urban Development. During the 1970s, Weaver served as the national director of the Municipal Assistance Corporation, which was formed during New York City's financial crisis. Another prominent member of Roosevelt's Black Cabinet was Eugene K. Jones, the Executive Secretary of the National Urban League, a major civil rights organization.

One of the most well-known members, and the only woman, was  Mary McLeod Bethune. Bethune's political affinity to the Roosevelts was so strong that she changed her party allegiance. Bethune was very closely tied to the community and believed she knew what African Americans really wanted. She was looked upon very highly by other members of the cabinet, and the younger men called her "Ma Bethune." Bethune was a personal friend of Eleanor Roosevelt and, uniquely among the cabinet, had access to the White House. Their friendship began during a luncheon when Eleanor Roosevelt sat Bethune to the right of the president, considered the seat of honor. Franklin Roosevelt was so impressed by one of Bethune's speeches that he appointed her to the Division of Negro Affairs in the newly created National Youth Administration.

Members of this group in 1938 included the following:

 Alfred Edgar Smith, Works Projects Administration
 Dr. Ambrose Caliver, Department of the Interior
 Arthur Weiseger, Department of Labor
 Charles E. Hall, Department of Commerce
 Constance E.H. Daniel, Department of Agriculture
 Dewey R. Jones, Department of the Interior;
 Edgar G. Brown, Civilian Conservation Corps
 Edward H. Lawson, Jr., Works Projects Administration
 Henry A. Hunt, Farm Credit Administration
 J. Parker Prescott, Housing Authority
 John W. Whitten, Works Projects Administration
 Joseph H. Evans, Farm Security Administration
 Joseph R. Houchins, Department of Commerce
 Lawrence A. Oxley, Department of Labor
 Mary McLeod Bethune, National Youth Administration
 Ralph E. Mizelle, US Postal Service
 Dr. Robert C. Weaver, Federal Housing Administration
 Dr. Roscoe C. Brown, Public Health Service
 William I. Houston, Department of Justice
 Dr. William J. Thomkins, Recorder of Deeds

At various times, others included:

 Dr. Charles L. Franklin, Social Security Board
 Eugene Kinckle Jones, Department of Commerce
 Frank Smith Horne, optometrist, college administrator, and lyricist
 William J. Trent, Federal Works Agency
 William H. Hastie, attorney, Department of the Interior

See also
 Civil rights movement (1896–1954)
 List of African-American United States Cabinet members
 United States Cabinet

References

Bibliography

 
 
 

 
 , Reprinted from the November 1927 Welfare Magazine

Further reading
Daniel, Walter. Ambrose Caliver: Adult Educator and Civil Servant, Syracuse, NY: Syracuse Univ Printing, 1966
 
Wilkins, Theresa B., "Ambrose Caliver: Distinguished Civil Servant", Journal of Negro Education, 1962

External links
"Mary Jane McLeod Bethune", American National Biography Online

 
African-American history between emancipation and the civil rights movement
African-American organizations
New Deal
Political terminology of the United States